is a passenger railway station in the city of Midori, Gunma, Japan, operated by the third sector railway company Watarase Keikoku Railway.

Lines

Station layout
The station has a single side platform and an island platform; however, one side of the island platform is not in use for traffic, thus effectively the station has two opposed side platforms. On the unused portion of the island platform, two carriages from a former Tobu Railway Type 1720 are permanently parked as a restaurant.

Adjacent stations

History
Gōdo Station opened on 6 September 1912 as a station on the Ashio Railway, but used the kanji “神土駅” to avoid confusion with the Kōbe Station in Hyōgo Prefecture. The kanji was changed to its present form on 29 March 1989 to match the local place name. The station building and platform were registered by the national government as a national Tangible Cultural Property in 2009. Two ancillary buildings, the rest house and the dangerous goods storeroom, were also granted the same Registered Tangible Cultural Property status later the same year.

Surrounding area
 
Kusaki Dam
Azuma Elementary School
Azuma Middle School

In popular culture 
The station features in the final scene of the 2009 film Tenshi no Koi, but instead uses the station name "Furada" in its signage.

See also
 List of railway stations in Japan

References

External links

 Station information (Watarase Keikoku) 

Railway stations in Gunma Prefecture
Railway stations in Japan opened in 1912
Midori, Gunma
Registered Tangible Cultural Properties